Genoplesium bishopii, commonly known as the Gibraltar Range midge orchid, is a small terrestrial orchid endemic to New South Wales. It has a single thin leaf fused to the flowering stem and up to thirty small, dark purplish red flowers. It grows in heathy forest and on the edges of swamps in the Gibraltar Range National Park.

Description
As with others in the genus, the flowers are inverted so that the labellum is above the column rather than below it. There is a callus in the centre of the labellum and extending nearly to its tip. Flowering occurs from November to January.

Taxonomy and naming
The Gibraltar Range midge orchid was first formally described in 2000 by David Jones who gave it the name Genoplesium  bishopii and published the description in The Orchadian. In 2002, Jones and Mark Clements changed the name to Corunastylis bishopii but the change has not been accepted by the Australian Plant Census.

Distribution and habitat
Genoplesium bishopii is only known from the Gibraltar Range National Park where it grows in heathy forest and on the edge of swamps.

References

bishopii
Endemic orchids of Australia
Orchids of New South Wales
Plants described in 2000